Muscat is the capital and largest city of Oman.

Muscat may also refer to:

Places in Oman
 Muscat Governorate, the region of Oman which includes the capital city
 Muscat District of Muscat Governorate.
 Muscat Securities Market, the stock exchange in Oman
 Muscat International Airport
 Muscat (football club), a football club in Oman
 Muscat and Oman, the predecessor state of Oman
 Old Muscat, the historic city of Muscat in Oman

Other uses
 Muscat (surname), a Maltese surname
 Muscat (grape), a variety of grape used for wine, table grapes, and raisins
 Muscat Stadium, a Japanese baseball stadium
 Muscats Motors, a car dealership in Malta

See also
Muskat, a surname